The Happy Prince is a studio album of phonograph records by Bing Crosby and Orson Welles of the Oscar Wilde short story The Happy Prince.

The story had been adapted for radio by Orson Welles in 1944, featuring a musical score by Bernard Herrmann. It was aired on the Philco Radio Hall of Fame broadcast on December 24, 1944 featuring Bing Crosby alongside Orson Welles, with Herrmann's music conducted by Victor Young. Lurene Tuttle played The Swallow.

Decca Records soon signed up the participants to make a commercial recording.

Reception
Down Beat magazine liked the album saying: "If you’ve been getting smothered lately in record stores with scads of children’s’ albums by everybody from Artie Shaw through Ronald Colman by way of Gene Kelly, try this one on your small son. It’s the Oscar Wilde fairy tale with a Bernard Herrmann score, and in very much better taste than anything else being turned out for the Christmas rush."

Track listing
These newly issued songs were featured on a 2-disc, 78 rpm album set, Decca Album No. A-420. Words by Oscar Wilde, music by Bernard Herrmann.  Recorded August 21, 1945 with Victor Young and His Orchestra.

Disc 1 (40007): Part 1 (3:08) / Part 2 (3:02)
Disc 2 (40008): Part 3 (2:54) / Part 4 (3:09)

Other releases
Decca released a dual 10” LP of The Happy Prince and The Small One on Decca DL6000 in 1949.

References

Bing Crosby albums
1946 albums
Decca Records albums
Orson Welles albums
Lurene Tuttle albums